Diego Bombassei (born 26 May 1971 in Auronzo di Cadore) is an Italian curler.

At the national level, he is a three-time Italian men's champion curler.

Teams

Private life
His cousin is Valter Bombassei, also an Italian curler, they was teammates played on European and World championships.

References

External links

Living people
1971 births
Sportspeople from the Province of Belluno
Italian male curlers
Italian curling champions